Mònica Bonell Tuset (born 7 August 1971) is a Democratic politician from Andorra. She served as second deputy mayor of the city of Canillo from 2003 and 2011. Her preparation for a political career came from being a technician of companies and tourist activities with focus on administration. She was also Deputy General Syndic of the General Council of Andorra between 2011 and 2019.

She has served as the Chairman of the Democratic Parliamentary Group, President of the Legislative Economy Committee, Member of the Legislative Committee on Foreign Policy, Member of the Legislative Committee on Territorial Policy, Urban Planning, and as the Environment Member of the Andorran Delegation to the Parliamentary Assembly of the Council of Europe (APCE).

References 

Democrats for Andorra politicians
Andorran women in politics
20th-century women politicians
Members of the General Council (Andorra)
Living people
1971 births